Transit camp may refer to:

Military camp
Transit Prisoner-of-war camp
Transit internment camp
Transit refugee camp
Transit concentration camp, in particular,
 Durchgangslager of Nazi concentration camps
 Transit Camp (film), a 1932 French-German drama film
Ma'abarot, Hebrew word for immigrant transit camp, established in the mid-20th-century
Transit Camp F.C., a football club based in Dar es Salaam, playing in the Tanzania Championship.